Ali Demi (18 January 1918 – 29 December 1943) was an Albanian hero of World War II and a communist. He was killed in battle fighting German forces in Vlora, Albania in 1943.

Biography
He was born in Filiates, Greece. Later Ali Demi studied at the Lyceum, in Tirana, Albania and in 1939 he participated in antifascist demonstrations. He was also one of the founders of the Communist party of Albania. He was sentenced to death by Italian forces but managed to escape and joined partisan forces. 
In 1943 he was killed in a battle fighting against German forces in Kaninë village, near Vlora.

Aftermath
In May 1944, the Greek People's Liberation Army formed and named a mixed unit of both Greeks and Cham Albanians in his honor, the IV "Ali Demi" battalion of 15th regiment.

Ali Demi Street and Ali Demi (neighborhood) in Tirana, are named after him.

References

1918 births
1943 deaths
Albanian communists
Albanian anti-fascists
Cham Albanians
Albanian people of World War II
Albanian resistance members
Ali
Resistance members killed by Nazi Germany
Heroes of Albania
Qemal Stafa High School alumni
People from Filiates
Greek emigrants to Albania